The 2016 WNBA season is the 19th season for the Dallas Wings franchise in the Women's National Basketball Association. It is their first in Dallas. The Wings finished with a record of 11–23, fifth in the Western Conference and eleventh overall.

Draft picks

Roster

Game log

Preseason game log

|- style="background:#fcc;"
| 1
| May 1, 201612:00 pm
| Indiana Fever
| 90–108
| 
| 
|
| Bankers Life Fieldhouse6,214
| 0–1
|- style="background:#fcc;"
| 2
| May 8, 20161:30 pm
| Connecticut Sun
| 74–82
| Johnson - 13
| 
|
| College Park Center2,326
| 0–2

Schedule

Preseason

Game log

Standings

Playoffs

Statistics

Regular season

Transactions

Subtractions

References

Dallas Wings seasons
Dallas
Dallas Wings